Carl Bergmann (born Ebersbach, Kingdom of Saxony, April 12, 1821; died New York, August 10, 1876) was a German-American cellist and conductor.

Biography
In 1827, he began studies with Adolph Zimmerman in Zittau, and later he studied with organist-composer Adolph Hesse in Breslau. By 1842, he was conducting and playing the cello in Breslau. Eventually, Bergmann conducted orchestras in Vienna, Breslau, Budapest, Warsaw, and Venice.

Motivated by his implication in the revolutions of 1848 in Vienna, Bergmann came to the United States in 1850 as first cellist in the Germania Orchestra, a touring band of young German musicians, mostly refugees. When the conductor of that orchestra resigned the same year, Bergmann took over. The Germania Orchestra subsequently based itself in Boston before disbanding in 1854 after giving 800 concerts over its career. During this period Bergmann directed the  Germanians in performances with the Handel and Haydn Society of that city, including the Boston premiere of Beethoven's Ninth Symphony. After this Bergmann went to Chicago and was immediately invited to direct the Chicago Philharmonic Society. However, he left after giving only two concerts because the Chicago musicians intrigued against him.

In 1854, he went to New York City to conduct the Männergesangverein Arion, a choral group of German-born men. When Theodore Eisfeld, conductor of the New York Philharmonic Society, became sick for the last concert of the 1854–1855 season, Bergmann replaced him, directing Wagner's Tannhäuser overture.  This concert was so successful that Bergmann became sole conductor for the 1855–1856 season.  In 1859 he conducted the American premiere of Tannhäuser at the Stadt Theater. It was the first performance of a Wagner opera in America. He also played cello in a renowned piano quintet that included Theodore Thomas on first violin and William Mason on piano. In addition to the Philharmonic, he also conducted a choral group, the New York Harmonic Society which later became the Mendelssohn Union. Bergmann organized and conducted a German music festival, held in the Winter Garden Theatre, in 1855, and in 1856 introduced German opera at Niblo's Garden. He conducted Italian as well as German opera in New York.

Eisfeld returned to conduct the Philharmonic Society for the 1856–1857 and 1857–1858 seasons, but Bergmann returned to the podium the next season, and shared the podium with Eisfeld between 1859 and 1865.  In 1865 Eisfeld returned to Europe, and Bergmann continued as sole conductor of the  Philharmonic Society until his death in 1876.

Bergmann's life and career declined after 1870.  Bergmann suffered from alcoholism. Since 1864, there had been a rival orchestra conducted by Theodore Thomas to contend with. And the panic of 1873 exacerbated the Philharmonic's financial problems.  In 1876, the Philharmonic board requested his resignation, and his wife, whose name has been lost to history, died.

In his autobiography, Theodore Thomas described Bergmann as "a talented musician and a fair 'cello player" but went on to criticize him as follows:
  
George Upton wrote:

Conductors of the New York Philharmonic Society, 1855–1876
 1855–1856 Bergmann
 1856–1858 Theodore Eisfeld
 1858–1859 Bergmann
 1859–1865 Bergmann and Eisfeld
 1865–1876 Bergmann

References

Bibliography

 
 

1821 births
1876 deaths
People from Döbeln
People from the Kingdom of Saxony
American conductors (music)
American male conductors (music)
German-American Forty-Eighters
Music directors of the New York Philharmonic
19th-century conductors (music)
19th-century American musicians